Paralephana is a genus of moths of the family Erebidae. It was described by George Hampson in 1926.

Species
Some species of this genus are:
Paralephana angulata (Viette, 1966)
Paralephana argyresthia Hampson, 1926
Paralephana bisignata Hampson, 1926
Paralephana camptocera Hampson, 1926
Paralephana catalai Viette, 1954
Paralephana consocia Hampson, 1926
Paralephana costisignata Hampson, 1926
Paralephana curvilinea Hampson, 1926
Paralephana decaryi Viette, 1954
Paralephana descarpentiesi Viette, 1954
Paralephana exangulata Gaede, 1939
Paralephana ferox Viette, 1958
Paralephana finipunctula (Holland, 1894)
Paralephana flavilinea Hampson, 1926
Paralephana incurvata Hampson, 1926
Paralephana jugalis Viette, 1958
Paralephana lakasy Viette, 1979
Paralephana leucopis Hampson, 1926
Paralephana linos Viette, 1972
Paralephana lobata Hampson, 1926
Paralephana mesoscia Hampson, 1926
Paralephana metaphaea Hampson, 1926
Paralephana monogona Hampson, 1926
Paralephana nigriciliata (Hampson, 1910)
Paralephana nigripalpis Hampson, 1926
Paralephana obliqua Hampson, 1926
Paralephana patagiata Hampson, 1926
Paralephana poliotis Hampson, 1926
Paralephana purpurascens Hampson, 1926
Paralephana pyxinodes Viette, 1958
Paralephana rectilinea Hampson, 1926
Paralephana salmonea Viette, 1966
Paralephana sarcochroa Hampson, 1926
Paralephana subpurpurascens Viette, 1954
Paralephana syntripta Viette, 1958
Paralephana talacai Viette, 1982
Paralephana umbrata Griveaud & Viette, 1962
Paralephana uniplagiata Viette, 1966
Paralephana westi D. S. Fletcher, 1961

References

 Hampson, G. F. 1926. Descriptions of New Genera and Species of Lepidoptera Phalaenae of the Subfamily Noctuinae (Noctuidae) in the British Museum (Natural History). 1–641.

Calpinae
Moth genera